ESPN on ABC (formerly known as ABC Sports from 1961 to 2006) is the branding used for sports event and documentary programming televised by the American Broadcasting Company (ABC) in the United States. Officially, the broadcast network retains its own sports division; however, in 2006, ABC's sports division was merged into ESPN Inc., which is the parent subsidiary of the cable sports network ESPN that is majority owned by ABC's corporate parent, The Walt Disney Company, in partnership with Hearst Communications.

ABC broadcasts use ESPN's production and announcing staff, and incorporate elements such as ESPN-branded on-screen graphics, SportsCenter in-game updates, and the BottomLine ticker. The ABC logo is still used for identification purposes such as a digital on-screen graphic during sports broadcasts on the network, and in promotions to disambiguate events airing the broadcast network from those shown on the ESPN cable channel.

The broadcast network's sports event coverage carried the ABC Sports brand prior to September 2, 2006. When ABC acquired a controlling interest in ESPN in 1984, it operated the cable network separately from its network sports division. The integration of ABC Sports with ESPN began after The Walt Disney Company bought ABC in 1996. The branding change to ESPN on ABC was made to better orient ESPN viewers with event telecasts on ABC and provide consistent branding for all sports broadcasts on Disney-owned channels (shortly thereafter, ESPN2's in-game graphics were likewise altered to simply use the main "ESPN" brand). Despite its name, ABC's sports coverage is supplemental to ESPN and (with occasional exceptions) not a simulcast of programs aired by the network, although ESPN and ESPN2 will often carry ABC's regional broadcasts that otherwise would not air in certain markets. As of 2022, ABC is the only broadcast television network to have rights to show games from all four major professional leagues all at the same time.

History

1960s and 1970s: Pre-Disney/ESPN
Like its longtime competitors CBS Sports and NBC Sports, ABC Sports was originally part of the news division of the ABC network, and, after 1961, was spun off into its own independent division.

When Roone Arledge came to ABC Sports as a producer of NCAA football games in 1960, the network was in financial shambles. The International Olympic Committee even wanted a bank to guarantee ABC's contract to broadcast the 1960 Olympics. At the time, Edgar Scherick served as the de facto head of ABC Sports. Scherick had joined the fledgling ABC television network when he persuaded it to purchase Sports Programs, Inc., in exchange for the network acquiring shares in the company. Scherick had formed the company after he left CBS, when the network would not make him the head of its sports programming unit (choosing to instead appoint former baseball public relations agent William C. McPhail). Before ABC Sports even became a formal division of the network, Scherick and ABC programming chief Tom Moore pulled off many programming deals involving the most popular American sporting events.

While Scherick was not interested in "For Men Only," he recognized the talent that Arledge had. Arledge realized ABC was the organization he was looking to become part of. The lack of a formal organization would offer him the opportunity to claim real power when the network matured. With this, he signed on with Scherick as an assistant producer, with Arledge eventually ascending to a role as executive producer of its sports telecasts.

Several months before ABC began broadcasting NCAA college football games, Arledge sent Scherick a remarkable memo, filled with youthful exuberance, and television production concepts which sports broadcasts have adhered to since. Network broadcasts of sporting events had previously consisted of simple set-ups and focused on the game itself. In his memo, Arledge not only offered another way to broadcast the game to the sports fan, but recognized that television had to take fans to the game. In addition, he had the forethought to realize that the broadcasts needed to attract, and hold the attention of female viewers, as well as males. On September 17, 1960, the then-29-year-old Arledge put his vision into reality with ABC's first NCAA college football broadcast from Birmingham, Alabama, between the Alabama Crimson Tide and the Georgia Bulldogs which Alabama won, 21–6.

Despite the production values he brought to NCAA college football, Scherick wanted low-budget sports programming (as in inexpensive broadcasting rights) that could attract and retain an audience. He hit upon the idea of broadcasting track and field events sponsored by the Amateur Athletic Union. While Americans were not exactly fans of track and field events, Scherick figured that Americans understood games.

In January 1961, Scherick called Arledge into his office, and asked him to attend the annual AAU board of governors meeting. While he was shaking hands, Scherick said, "if the mood seemed right, might he cut a deal to broadcast AAU events on ABC?" It seemed like a tall assignment, however as Scherick said years later, "Roone was a gentile and I was not." Arledge came back with a deal for ABC to broadcast all AAU events for $50,000 per year. Next, Scherick and Arledge divided up their NCAA college football sponsor list. They then telephoned their sponsors and said in so many words, "Advertise on our new sports show coming up in April, or forget about buying commercials on NCAA college football this fall." The two persuaded enough sponsors to advertise on the broadcasts, though it took them to the last day of a deadline imposed by ABC's programming operations to do it.

Wide World of Sports – an anthology series featuring a different sporting event each broadcast, which premiered on the network on April 29, 1961 – suited Scherick's plans exactly. By exploiting the speed of jet transportation and flexibility of videotape, Scherick was able to undercut NBC and CBS's advantages in broadcasting live sporting events. In that era, with communications nowhere near as universal as they are in the present day, ABC was able to safely record events on videotape for later broadcast without worrying about an audience finding out the results. Arledge, his colleague Chuck Howard, and Jim McKay (who left CBS for this opportunity) made up the show on a week-by-week basis during the first year of Wide Worlds run. Arledge had a genius for the dramatic storyline that unfolded in the course of a game or event. McKay's honest curiosity and reporter's bluntness gave the show an emotional appeal which attracted viewers who might not have otherwise watched a sporting event. More importantly from Arledge's perspective, Wide World of Sports allowed him to demonstrate his ability as an administrator as well as a producer.

His ability to provide prime sports content was solidified in 1964, when ABC appointed Arledge as the vice president of ABC Sports. That same year, Scherick left the sports division to become ABC's vice president of programming – leaving Arledge as the top executive at ABC Sports, although he would not gain a formal title as president for four years.

In 1968, Arledge was formally appointed as president of ABC Sports. As the sports division's president for the succeeding 18 years, his job was his hobby; as he described it, it was good because he watched sports for work rather than leisure, but had a downside as he had no time left for leisure activities. He made sportsmen into stars, a trend he would later bring to the news division where he lured established anchors and correspondents such as David Brinkley and Diane Sawyer and paid unheard-of salaries, including the first million-dollar contract to Barbara Walters.

Arledge personally produced all ten of ABC's Olympic Games broadcasts, created the primetime Monday Night Football and coined the famous "thrill of victory, agony of defeat" tagline first used on Wide World of Sports – although ABC insiders of that era attribute the authorship to legendary sports broadcaster Jim McKay. Over the next few years, the look of the network's sports telecasts became more intimate and entertaining as under Arledge, ABC introduced techniques such as slow motion replay, freeze frame, instant replay, split-screen, hand-held cameras, endzone cameras, underwater cameras and cameras on cranes.

As part of an agreement with the National Football League (which completed its merger with the American Football League that year), Monday Night Football debuted on ABC in September 1970, which served as the NFL's premier game of the week until 2006, when Sunday Night Football, which moved to NBC that year as part of a broadcast deal that in turn saw MNF move to ESPN, took over as the league's marquee game. Although it suffered a decline in ratings toward the end of its ABC run, the program was a hit for the network; according to ABC president Leonard Goldenson, Monday Night Football helped regularly score ABC an audience share of 15%–16%.

With the creation of Monday Night Football, Arledge not only anchored ABC's primetime programming, but created a national pastime. At first, nobody – including the affiliates and the advertisers – supported the idea of primetime football games at the beginning of the week. Arledge said regarding this skepticism, "But I thought there was something special about football, because there are so few games, and relatively few teams. Also, there is something about the look of a night game, with the lights bouncing off the helmets."

It was not only the lights that made watching Arledge-style football on ABC an event in itself. The games were transformed into events through the technical innovations envisioned by Arledge and through a new style of sportscaster embodied in Howard Cosell. ABC was the first network not to allow announcer approval by the league from which it was purchasing broadcast rights. Arledge said, "CBS had been the basic football network. They treated it like a religion and would almost never criticize it. But if you screwed up on Monday Night Football, Cosell would let everyone know about it." Arledge proudly pointed out that the program "changed the habits of the nation."

In 1977, Arledge's executive responsibilities at ABC were expanded, and he was made president of ABC News while remaining as head of ABC Sports.

Ring Magazine Scandal
In 1976, unscrupulous managing editor of The Ring, Johnny Ort, fabricated records of selected boxers, to elevate them, thereby securing them lucrative fights on the American ABC television network, as part of the United States Championship Tournament, orchestrated by promoter Don King to capitalize on the patriotism surrounding the United States Bicentennial and the American amateur success at the 1976 Summer Olympic Games. King's idea was to defeat the non-American boxers who held the vast majority of world titles below the heavyweight division. Keeping in line with the patriotic theme of the promotion, King held shows at "patriotic" locales—such as the United States Naval Academy in Annapolis, Maryland, as well as on an aircraft carrier stationed off Pensacola, Florida.  Despite the above, the 1977 Ring Record Book contained the fictitious additions to the records of the boxers in question and were never taken out of their records of the boxers. Those dubious bouts would continue to appear in subsequent Ring Record Book editions.

The Ring Record magazine scandal was uncovered by boxing writer Malcolm "Flash" Gordon and ABC staffer Alex Wallau. After Gordon and Wallau's evidence was presented to ABC executive Roone Arledge the United States Championship tournament was cancelled. Despite being hoodwinked and manipulated by Don King, in 1977 ABC made Arledge president of the then low-rated network news division, all while Arledge retained control of the Sports Division. The ABC Ring Scandal would lead to the eventual resignation of New York State Boxing Commissioner James Farley Jr., who had lent his name to the Championship fights and who was the son of former New York State Athletic Commissioner and former Postmaster General James Aloysius Farley, who had died one year prior to the scandal. Farley Jr., had accepted a hotel room which had been furnished by King. This was used by David W. Burke who at that time was a secretary of Governor Hugh Carey, to force Farley Jr.'s eventual resignation form the New York State Athletic commission. In August 1977 Mr. Arledge announced the appointment of David W. Burke, as his new assistant for administration, with the title of vice president.  Mr. Burke helped develop programs including This Week with David Brinkley and Nightline, and had no prior television or journalism experience prior to his hiring by Arledge. No formal charges of impropriety were ever filed against Farley Jr.. The following year the Boxing Writers Association dedicated their highest honor, the "James A. Farley Award", after Farley Sr., for honesty and integrity in the sport of boxing.

1980s and 1990s: Disney purchase and ESPN integration

The seeds of its eventual integration with ESPN occurred when ABC acquired a controlling interest in ESPN from Getty Oil in 1984. One year later, Capital Cities Communications purchased ABC for US$3.5 billion. Although some ESPN sportscasters such as John Saunders and Dick Vitale began to also appear on ABC Sports telecasts and shared some sports content (particularly the USFL), ESPN and ABC Sports continued to operate as separate entities.

After The Walt Disney Company bought Capital Cities/ABC in 1996, Disney started to slowly integrate ESPN and ABC Sports. ESPN personalities like Chris Berman, Mike Tirico and Brad Nessler also began working on ABC Sports broadcasts. In 1998, ESPN adopted the graphics and music package used by ABC Sports for Monday Night Football for the network's Sunday Night Football broadcasts. ESPN graphics were also utilized on ABC's motorsports telecasts, including IndyCar and NASCAR events, during this period.

That same year, ESPN signed a five-year contract to televise National Hockey League (NHL) games, whereby the cable network essentially purchased time on ABC to air selected NHL games on the broadcast network. This was noted in copyright tags at the conclusion of the telecasts (i.e., "The preceding program has been paid for by ESPN, Inc."). ESPN later signed a similar television rights contract with the National Basketball Association in 2002, allowing it to produce and broadcast NBA games on ABC under a similar time buy arrangement on the broadcast network.

2000–2005: Continued integration

Between 2000 and 2002, many ABC Sports programs utilized graphics almost identical to those used on ESPN. One notable exception was Monday Night Football, which switched to a different graphics package as part of then-new producer Don Ohlmeyer's attempt to provide some renewed vigor into those telecasts. Subsequently, ABC changed graphics packages each fall from 2002 to 2005, while ESPN's basically remained consistent.

Meanwhile, Disney continued to consolidate the corporate structure of ESPN and ABC Sports. Steve Bornstein was given the title as president of both ESPN and ABC Sports in 1996. The sales, marketing, and production departments of both divisions were eventually merged. As a result, ESPN uses some union production crews for its coverage (as the networks normally do), whereas non-union personnel are quite common in cable sports broadcasting.

2006–present: The end of ABC Sports and introduction of ESPN on ABC
In August 2006, it was announced that ABC Sports would be totally integrated into ESPN, incorporating the graphics and music used by the cable channel and its related television properties, and production staff. The brand integration does not directly affect whether the ESPN cable channel or ABC carries a particular event, as in most cases this is governed by contracts with the applicable league or organization. Perhaps confusingly, this means that some events are broadcast with ESPN branding during ABC coverage, even though another channel owns the cable rights. For example, TNT held the cable television rights to the British Open from 2003 to 2009 (with ABC carrying the tournament's weekend coverage); in addition, from 2009 to 2018, ABC had shared the rights to IndyCar Series with NBCSN. IndyCar fans who have criticized ESPN on ABC's race broadcasts have used "Always Bad Coverage" as a derisive backronym pertaining to the quality of the telecasts. On the other hand, ESPN airs Major League Baseball games; however, ABC does not as Fox holds the broadcast television rights to the league's game telecasts. ABC would later air MLB postseason games in 2020 as part of the 2020 Wild Card Series. ABC would also air Sunday Night Baseball on August 8, 2021 between the Chicago White Sox and Chicago Cubs. This would be the first exclusive regular season telecast of Major League Baseball on ABC since 1989.

The last live sporting event televised under the ABC Sports banner was the United States Championship Game in the Little League World Series on Saturday, August 26, 2006 (ABC was slated to carry the Little League World Series Championship Game on Sunday, August 27, however rain forced the postponement of the game to the following Monday, August 28, with that game subsequently airing on ESPN2). The changeover took effect the following weekend to coincide with the start of the college football season, with NBA, IndyCar Series and NASCAR coverage eventually following suit.

However, ABC used a separate graphics package (incorporating the network's own logo) during its coverage of the final round of the Scripps National Spelling Bee, which were similar to the older-styled ESPN graphics but with a yellow base. In 2008, though, it utilized the newer yellow and red ESPN graphics which had been used on other recent telecasts, but with the ABC logo. These graphics were used through 2010. In 2011, the Bee was moved off of network TV and the telecast began to be produced by Scripps Television, which uses its own graphics.

Limited re-emphasis on ABC brand since 2015
As ESPN has signed new contracts with various conferences to produce college football coverage, the network has begun branding its coverage of select conferences to which it has rights. This branding was first seen on SEC broadcasts in 2011, which became the "SEC on ESPN". ACC broadcasts followed suit in 2012 becoming the "ACC on ESPN". Despite the fact that ACC games also air on ABC, the games remain branded as the "ACC on ESPN" regardless of network. In 2016, a new contract brought conference branding to Big Ten telecasts as well, which air on both ESPN and ABC. While Big Ten games that air on ESPN cable channels are branded as the "Big Ten on ESPN", games airing on ABC are now branded as the "Big Ten on ABC". The next year, in 2017, the Pac-12 Conference began branding their games under the title, "Pac-12 on ESPN". While the program is still officially part of ESPN College Football which is reflected when talent appears on screen, the Big Ten on ABC logo and branding is used for intro, program IDs, and replay wipes. This is the first time any regularly scheduled sporting event outside of the National Spelling Bee has carried any ABC branding since 2006.

Also starting with Saturday Primetime in 2017, live NBA game action no longer shows the ESPN identification on screen. Previously under ESPN on ABC (since 2006–07), the ESPN logo was part of the score banner, while the ABC logo was separately floating on the right side of the screen, remaining on screen during replays. The version of the new 2016–17 graphics package used on ABC replaces the ESPN logo in the score banner with several stars, while the ABC logo (still constantly on screen) anchors the right side of the banner; however for the 2017–18 season, the ESPN logo was reintroduced onto a revised version of the score banner with the ABC logo still located to the right. In addition, commercial transitions for ABC games now contain the ABC logo. It is the first time NBA games on ABC don't have ESPN identification during live action since the 2006 NBA Finals.

An exception was during the MLS Cup 2019 on ABC, where no ESPN logo other than the mic flags appeared on the screen and the broadcast was introduced as "the 2019 MLS Cup Final on ABC" with the ABC logo appearing on the screen.

For all soccer coverage, the ABC branding is used with little to no use of the ESPN logo (for example the Bundesliga on ABC).

Nostalgia-related uses of ABC Sports brand elements since 2017
Beginning in 2017, older ABC Sports branding elements have been re-used nostalgically by the network's sports-themed reality competition shows (which also import on-air talent from ESPN).

The revival of Battle of the Network Stars paid homage to the 1970s original (then hosted by Monday Night Football'''s Howard Cosell). "If you're expecting to see the yellow jackets and the [old school ABC Sports] mic flags, you'll be delighted," Executive Andrew Grossman told reporters." Episodes also began with a remake of the network's iconic Wide World of Sports introduction.

The 2019 "extreme miniature golf" competition Holey Moley also used 1970s replica ABC Sports jackets on its lead hosts, ESPN's Joe Tessitore and former Fox NFL Sunday prognosticator Rob Riggle, and guest commentators. Tessitore commented that its use was an homage to Cosell and the network's history of varied sports offerings. "That gold jacket was doing many extreme events; barrel jumping, Acapulco cliff diving. You can look at the history of legitimate sports coverage on ABC, ...that gold jacket was attached to a lot of sports that had one-year, two-year runs on Saturday afternoon on ABC ...I think it's something that Roone Arledge, who was always very forward-thinking, would recognize. ...in the Elvis Presley-Evel Knievel era of TV programming, there would have been a place for Holey Moley."

To celebrate the 50th anniversary of Monday Night Football, Steve Levy, Brian Griese, Louis Riddick, Lisa Salters, and John Parry all wore special ABC Sports replica jackets during the September 21 game between the New Orleans Saints and the Las Vegas Raiders. The game aired on ESPN, with ABC simulcasting the game, the network's first NFL regular season game in almost 15 years. This game was also the first NFL game to be played in the city of Las Vegas, and the first NFL game to be played in the state of Nevada. The gold jackets returned on October 31, 2022 MNF broadcast between the Cincinnati Bengals and the Cleveland Browns, this time worn by the new top team of Joe Buck, Troy Aikman and Lisa Salters.

To celebrate the first exclusive regular season telecast of a Major League Baseball game on ABC since 1989, Matt Vasgersian, Alex Rodriguez, and Buster Olney wore special ABC Sports patches during Sunday Night Baseball on August 8, 2021 between the Chicago White Sox and Chicago Cubs. Special graphics inspired by The Baseball Network were also used in conjunction with the standard ESPN MLB graphics. The game also featured a special guest appearance by former ABC announcer Al Michaels.

ESPN, ABC Sports, and Hearst

Despite the rebranding, ABC Sports continues to exist, at least nominally, as a division of the ABC network. One indication of this was the retention of George Bodenheimer's official title as "President, ESPN Inc. and ABC Sports" even after the rebranding – the second part of the title would presumably be unnecessary if ESPN had fully absorbed ABC's sports operations – though following Bodenheimer's retirement and the subsequent appointment of John Skipper at the end of 2011, the title was shortened to "President, ESPN Inc." In addition, ABC itself maintains the copyright over many of the ESPN-branded broadcasts, if they are not contractually assigned to the applicable league or organizer, suggesting that ESPN has merely "loaned" usage of its brand name, staff and infrastructure to ABC, rather than having acquired ABC Sports outright. ABC News Radio also continues to brand its short-form sports updates as ABC Sports Radio; this service is separate from the ESPN Radio network.

This is likely a minor technicality stemming from ESPN being technically a joint venture between Disney (which owns an 80% controlling interest) and the Hearst Corporation (which owns the remaining 20%). Disney has long exercised operational control of the network, while Hearst is believed to be more of a silent partner rather than an active participant in ESPN's management. However, this relationship does mean that Hearst's ABC-affiliated stations – such as WCVB-TV in Boston; WMUR-TV in Manchester, New Hampshire; WTAE-TV in Pittsburgh; WISN-TV in Milwaukee; WPBF-TV in West Palm Beach; and KMBC-TV in Kansas City – have right of first refusal to local simulcasts of ESPN-televised Monday Night Football games involving home-market teams, which are very rarely waived to other stations within their markets. Equally, other Hearst-owned stations such as NBC affiliates WLWT-TV in Cincinnati,  WBAL-TV in Baltimore, and WDSU-TV in New Orleans have been able to air NFL games from ESPN for the same reason (independent station WMOR-TV in the Tampa market is also eligible to air these games, but rarely if ever does so).

Under NFL broadcasting rules, the league's cable-televised games must be simulcast on broadcast television in the local markets of the teams playing in the broadcast, though the game is not permitted to air in the home team's market if tickets do not sell out 72 hours before kickoff – games that are not sold out must be blacked out in the market of origin (due to the league's March 2015 decision to suspend its blackout policies, all NFL games televised by ESPN during the 2015 season are allowed to air on broadcast television in the originating market of the game and the home markets of both participating teams). Similar rules and rights were previously in place for ESPN-televised Major League Baseball playoff games, except in that non-sellout games were not blacked out (Major League Baseball does not black out games based on attendance, but rather to protect local broadcasters). ABC owned-and-operated stations also have right of first refusal for NFL (and previously Major League Baseball postseason) simulcasts from ESPN, though in recent years the stations have passed on airing the game telecasts in favor of carrying ABC's Monday night schedule, which includes the popular reality competition series Dancing with the Stars. With the series moving to Disney+ beginning with Season 31, ABC affiliates will more than likely air future MNF simulcasts.

Siphoning

ESPN and The Walt Disney Company have been criticized for decreasing the amount of sports programming televised on ABC. Several ABC affiliates have also voiced opposition regarding the increasing migration of live sporting event telecasts from ABC to ESPN.

An example was in regards to NASCAR race broadcasts: from 2007 to 2009, ABC aired all of the Chase for the NASCAR Sprint Cup races, along with one other race. From 2010 to 2014, only three Sprint Cup races and one Chase race (Charlotte) were shown on ABC, to the outrage of many NASCAR fans and sponsors. Several other events such as college football's Rose Bowl and Capital One Bowl games, and the British Open golf tournament have also been transferred from ABC to ESPN (although the Capital One Bowl would return to ABC in 2013). This, however, is not entirely the fault of ESPN, as ABC in general has attracted a primarily female viewership in recent years, with sports largely attracting a male-dominated –though not exclusive – audience.

The decrease in sports events televised by ABC has resulted in the network having a very inconsistent weekend afternoon sports schedule similar – if not somewhat equal – to Fox in previous years (and to some extent, to this day, even with the expansion of sports coverage on Fox since 2011); ESPN-produced sports specials (aired as part of the 30 for 30 and E:60 anthology series) and/or more recently, figure skating and gymnastics specials supplied by Disson Skating (a subsidiary of independent production company Disson Sports & Entertainment) as well as syndicated programs or infomercials scheduled by the network's owned-and-operated stations and affiliates fill the weekend afternoon schedule on days when the network is not scheduled to air a sporting event; until 2014, ABC-supplied rerun blocks of certain prime-time network shows and occasional theatrical film telecasts have also filled the schedule on weekend afternoons without a scheduled sports event. As a consequence of this, ABC turned over an hour of its then-existing two-hour Sunday afternoon block (from 4 to 5 p.m. Eastern Time) to its affiliates on June 21, 2015, reducing its Sunday schedule on weeks without major sporting events to one hour; the 5 p.m. (Eastern) hour that was retained is usually reserved for rebroadcasts of ESPN sports documentaries. However, as of January 2016, ABC rescinded the remaining hour of its Sunday afternoon schedule (5–6pm Eastern Time) back to its affiliates thus leaving ABC without a Sunday afternoon block (save for major sporting events). This exclusively relegated ABC's sports schedule to Saturday afternoons (and by extension, ABC's non-news weekend schedule to 3 to 6 pm and 8 to 11 pm on Saturdays and 7:00 to 11:00 pm on Sundays). ABC's in-house network-programmed Sunday schedule not counting news-related programming as a result of this is now exclusively relegated to its four-hour prime time block (from 7 to 11 pm).

In the past few years, ABC has lost several lucrative sports contracts. It lost the rights for the American Le Mans Series in 2013 when it merged with the Rolex Grand Am Series to form the WeatherTech SportsCar Championship and subsequently moved to Fox in 2014, later moving to NBC Sports in 2019. It also ended its FIFA coverage after the 2014 FIFA World Cup with Fox acquiring the rights starting in 2015. It then lost its NASCAR broadcast rights the same year with rights being picked up by NBC in 2015. Also, it phased out the last of its college basketball coverage also in the same year (the SEC men's basketball tournament) with the tournament being moved to the ESPN cable networks, although college basketball would later return to the network in 2019. It also gave up its highlights show relating to the British Open golf tournament in 2015, as ESPN later sold the rights to NBC in 2016. In 2016, ABC ended its regularly scheduled doubleheaders for its NBA Sunday Showcase, opting to opening up a window for Saturday night games and leaving single games on Sunday afternoons in most cases. In addition, ABC discontinued airing Grantland-related programming when the brand shut down operations in October. The network also lost rights to broadcast the IndyCar Series, including the Indianapolis 500, in 2018 with the rights moving to NBC Sports, which has already been the series' cable partner (moving the race away from ABC after 54 years); coincidentally in that same year, ABC will air several Formula One races a year after ESPN acquired the F1 rights from NBC Sports.

ESPN began simulcasting an NFL Wild Card Playoff game on ABC starting in 2016, marking the first time ABC had an NFL game since Super Bowl XL; this was later followed by the Pro Bowl starting in 2018. Additionally, ABC simulcast ESPN's coverage of rounds 4–7 of the 2018 NFL Draft. Then, starting in 2019, ABC aired all three days of the draft. ABC will be added back into the Super Bowl rotation when the new NFL broadcast deal takes effect in 2023.

On May 6, 2019, the XFL announced that ESPN and Fox Sports have acquired the rights to broadcast the league's return, with the broadcasts airing on ABC, ESPN, Fox, and FS1.

Picture format differences from ESPN cable outlets
Unlike other ESPN networks, ESPN on ABC events were still produced with graphics and a BottomLine framed for the 4:3 aspect ratio – as opposed to the 16:9 formatting used for the ticker and graphics on the ESPN family of networks, as well as CBS, Fox, and NBC's sports telecasts. However, beginning during the 2016 Little League World Series in August 2016, ABC migrated to a 16:9 presentation for ESPN on ABC broadcasts, similar to the ESPN cable networks, as ABC's entertainment programming also switched to a 16:9 presentation in September.

Taglines
Each ABC Sports broadcast would usually begin with the tagline: "The following is a special presentation of ABC Sports." Until September 1998, ABC Sports programs ended with the line "This has been a presentation of ABC Sports. Recognized around the world as the leader in sports television."

After Disney began to integrate ESPN and ABC Sports after buying both companies in 1996, ABC changed the tagline to "Continuing the tradition of excellence." This tagline lasted from September 1998 through late 2002. Beginning in 2001, ABC added the tagline to "ABC Sports: Championship Television," in regards to ABC's sports championship lineup (which included the Bowl Championship Series, the Stanley Cup Finals, the Super Bowl, the NBA Finals, the Indianapolis 500, and the FIFA World Cup), which lasted through September 2, 2006, when Disney totally integrated ESPN into ABC Sports.

Since 2000, the closing tagline – "This has been a presentation of ABC Sports, in association with ESPN" – had been used at the end of each NHL and NBA broadcast on ABC, because of their deals through ESPN. This lasted through September 2, 2006, when the tagline “This has been a presentation of ESPN, The Worldwide Leader in Sports” became permanent for all ABC broadcasts, when ABC Sports was renamed ESPN on ABC.

When the ESPN on ABC transition was complete, each broadcast at first used the tagline "The following is a special presentation of ESPN on ABC" is used, while ending with the tagline, "This has been a special presentation of ESPN on ABC", in a similar manner to ABC Sports back then. The ending had been used on a regular basis from 2006 through 2012, but as of today, has been rarely used. In late 2013, ESPN introduced a new intro for ESPN on ABC, with two different voiceovers being recorded. One with the announcer saying “A special presentation”, another with the same announcer saying “A presentation”. If there was a string of various programming on a certain weekend or a simulcast of an event airing on ESPN (most notably the final day of the NFL Draft), the tagline "You're watching ESPN on ABC" has been used.

For ABC's primetime college football games in 2018, every broadcast had the tagline, "This is ESPN on ABC, brought to you in part by Samsung QLED TV, the official TV of ESPN College Football". This tagline became permanent for every college football game aired on ABC in 2019, except for a few games. Beginning with the 2021 college football season, ESPN reverted back to the above tagline full-time.

On days where ABC airs events on holidays, e.g. Christmas and New Year's Day, each broadcast had the tagline "The following is a special holiday presentation of ESPN on ABC." This is primarily used before the pregame show during ABC's NBA Christmas Day tripleheader (2 ABC exclusive games, the last one is also simulcast on ESPN, but all 5 games are now televised on ABC and simulcast on ESPN since 2022), and for ABC's coverage of the Citrus Bowl on New Year's Day.

Prior to the 2022 LLWS Championship Game and the 2022 college football season, a new opening sequence was introduced, which begins as a black screen, then zooms out from the ESPN logo, and a red line flashes through the logo, and unveiling the ESPN on ABC logo in white, with red lining. A new tagline, "This is ESPN on ABC", as well as a new score is also introduced, with the latter keeping the ending part of the score from 2006-early 2022. Furthermore, the ESPN on ABC logo is now shown as a persistent screen bug on the top right corner throughout ESPN events airing on ABC. In the case of playoff/championship games, the ESPN on ABC screen bug will have more of a golden color.

Programs throughout the years

Current
 NFL on ABC (1948–1950, 1952–1955, 1959, 1970–2005, 2015–present)
 Monday Night Football (self-produced; 1970–2005, select simulcast of ESPN’s coverage; 2020–present) Select ABC exclusive games 2022-present.
NFL Wild Card Playoff game (self-produced; 1990–2005, simulcast of ESPN's coverage; 2016–present)
NFL Divisional Playoff game (starting 2023 NFL season)
 Pro Bowl (self-produced; 1975–1987, 1995–2003, 2024 and onwards; simulcast of ESPN's coverage; 2018–2023)
 NFL Draft (simulcast of ESPN's day 3 coverage, 2018–present; self-produced day 1 and 2 coverage, 2019–present)
 NFL Scouting Combine (2019–present)
 Back Together Saturday (2021–present, simulcast on ESPN)
Super Bowl: XIX, XXII, XXV, XXIX, XXXIV, XXXVII, XL, LXI, and LXV
 NBA on ABC (1964–1973, 2002–present)
 NBA Saturday Primetime (2015–present)
 NBA Sunday Showcase (2003–present)
 NBA Christmas Special (1967–1972, 2002–present)
 NBA playoffs (1964–1973, 2003–present)
 NBA Finals (1965–1973, 2003–present)
 NBA Draft (2021–present)
 Major League Baseball on ABC (1948–1950, 1953–1954, 1960–1961, 1965, 1976–1989, 1994–1995, 2020–present)
 Major League Baseball Wild Card Series (2020, 2022–present)
 Select Sunday Night Baseball game (2021, 2023–present)
 NHL on ABC (1993–1994, 2000–2004, 2021–present)
 NHL Thanksgiving Showdown (2021, 2023–present)
 NHL Stadium Series (2023-present)
 ABC Hockey Saturday (2022–present)
 NHL All-Star Game (2000–2004; 2022–present)
 Stanley Cup Playoffs (1993–1994; 2000–2004; 2023–present)
 Stanley Cup Finals (2000–2004; 2022, 2024, 2026, 2028)
 Soccer on ABC Bundesliga (2021–present)
 La Liga (2021–present)
 Supercopa de España (2023–present)
 ESPN College Football on ABC (1950, 1952, 1954-1956, 1960–present)
 American, ACC, Big 12, Pac-12, and SEC
 Saturday Night Football (2006–present)
 VRBO Citrus Bowl (1987–2010, 2013–present)
 Cricket Wireless Celebration Bowl (2015–2019, 2021–present)
 Las Vegas Bowl (2001, 2013–2019, 2023-present)
 New Mexico Bowl (2022-present)
 LA Bowl (2021-present)
 Music City Bowl (2022-present)
 Big 12 Championship Game (1996–2010, 2018–present)
 ACC Championship Game (2005–2007, 2013–present)
 AAC Championship Game (2015–present)
 SEC Championship Game (1993–2000, 2024–present)
 Pac-12 Football Championship Game (2019, 2021, 2023)
 ESPN College Basketball on ABC (1962, 1973, 1978, 1987–2014, 2019–present)
 Little League World Series (1963–2019, 2021-present)
 USA & International Championships
 Saturday & Sunday mid bracket coverage
  X Games (1997–present)
 World of X Games (2014–present)
 WNBA on ESPN (2003–present)
 WNBA All-Star Game
 Select WNBA regular season games
 WNBA Playoffs
 Select Sunday games of the WNBA FinalsTennis on ESPN Wimbledon (2012–present): condensed re-broadcasts of ESPN's coverage of Gentlemen's and Ladies' Singles finals
Live Wimbledon Middle Weekend  matches (2022-present)
 US Open: Arthur Ashe Kids Day
 Australian Open (highlights 2022–present)
 Formula One (2018–2019; 2021–present) 
 Monaco Grand Prix (re-broadcast annually; available live since 2023), Canadian Grand Prix, United States Grand Prix, Mexican Grand Prix, Miami Grand Prix (all coverage is simulcasted from Sky Sports F1)
 UFC on ABC (ESPN+ simulcasts, 2021–present)
 NCAA Division I women's basketball tournament (2021–present)
 Regular Season games 2021–present
 National Championship Game 2023–present
 NCAA Women's Gymnastics Championships (2021–present)
 Regular Season 2022–present
 NCAA Division I softball tournament (2021–present)
 XFL (2020; 2023–present)
 Premier Lacrosse League (2022–present)
 Professional Pickleball Association- PPA Tour bubly Team Championships (2022–present)

Additional programming
 New York City Marathon (2013–present): condensed rebroadcast of ESPN2's coverage; coverage simulcast live on WABC-TV in New York
 Tournament of Roses Parade (1989–present): produced by ABC Sports from 1989 to 2006 and by ESPN since 2007
 ESPY Awards (2015–2019; 2021–present)(rebroadcast in 2020 since live coverage was on ESPN)
 AKC National Championship (2021 present)
 SportsCenter (2020–present; occasional broadcasts)

Former programs
 Major League Baseball on ABC Major League Baseball Game of the Week (1953–1954, 1960–1965)
 Monday Night Baseball (1976–1988, telecasts moved to Thursday for 1989)
 Baseball Night in America (1994–1995)
 World Series: –, and 1995 (Games 1, 4, & 5)
 College Football on ABC Sugar Bowl (1953–1957, 1970–2006)
 Rose Bowl Game (1989–2010)
 Fiesta Bowl (1999–2006)
 Orange Bowl (1962–1964, 1999–2006)
 Gator Bowl (1965–1968, 1972–1985)
 Aloha Bowl (1986–2000)
 Army–Navy Game (1954, 1960–1961, 1966–1981, 1983, 1991–1995)
 Peach Bowl (1989–1990)
 Liberty Bowl (1966–1971, 1976–1980, 1995, 2011, 2017)
 Pinstripe Bowl (2015)
 Belk Bowl (2018)
 Outback Bowl (2011–2012, 2017, 2021)
 Boca Raton Bowl (2019)
 Camping World Bowl (2019)
 First Responder Bowl (2020)
 Gasparilla Bowl (2020)
 Independence Bowl (1990, 1991, 2014, 2021)
  Big Ten Conference
 NCAA Division I Football Championship (1978–1981, 1983, 2020, 2021, 2023)
 PGA Tour on ABC (1962–2009)
 The Open Championship (1962–2009)
 PGA Championship (1966–1990)
 U.S. Open (1966–1994)
 Senior Open Championship (1990–2009)
 LPGA Kraft Nabisco Championship (1991–2005)
 Women's British Open (2001–2009)
 CME Group Tour Championship, Final round (2015–2018)
 Monday Night Golf (1999–2005)
 Olympics on ABC
 Winter Olympic Games (1964, 1968, 1976, 1980, 1984, 1988)
 Summer Olympic Games (1968, 1972, 1976, 1984)
 Wide World of Sports (1961–1998 as a series, weekend afternoon programming title 1998–2006)
 NFL on ABC Thursday Night Kickoff game (2003–2005)
 NFL Honors (2022)
 Thoroughbred Racing on ABC Kentucky Derby (1975–2000)
 Preakness Stakes (1977–2000)
 Belmont Stakes (1986–2000, 2006–2010)
 Breeders' Cup (2008–2011)Tennis on ESPN BNP Paribas Open (2011–2012, 2019)
 A highlight show on the Championships' rest day (2012-2021)
 American Football League (1960–1964)
 United States Football League (1983–1985)
 World League of American Football (1991–1992)
 Arena Football League on ESPN (1998–2002, 2007–2008)
 Continental Football League (1966–1969)
 North American Soccer League (1979–1981)
 FIFA World Cup (1970, 1982, 1994, 1998, 2002, 2006, 2010, and 2014)
 FIFA Women's World Cup (1999, 2003 and 2011)
 Serie A 2021
 Indianapolis 500 (1965–2018)
 NASCAR on ABC (1961, 1971, 1975–1976, 1979–1982, 1984–2000, 2007–2014)
 Championship Auto Racing Teams (1983–2001, 2007)
 IndyCar Series on ABC (1996–2018)
 International Race of Champions (1974–1980, 1987–2003)
 American Le Mans Series (2008–2009, 2011–2013)
 Fight of the Week (1960–1964)
 Professional Bowlers Tour (1962–1997)
 The Superstars (1973–1984, 1991–1994, 1998–2002)
 The American Sportsman (1965–1986)
 Scripps National Spelling Bee (2006–2010)
 ESPN Sports Saturday (2010–2015)
 Overwatch League (2019): Stage Semifinals & Finals
 UEFA European Championship (2008, 2012, 2016, 2021)
 SheBelieves Cup (2022)
 UEFA Nations League (2020)
 FIFA World Cup qualification (2021)
 MLS on ESPN (1996–2008, 2020–2022)
 MLS Cup (1996–2008, 2019, 2021)

Personalities

Current

Play-by-play
 NBA on ABC – Mike Breen, Mark Jones, Dave Pasch, Ryan Ruocco, Beth Mowins
 Monday Night Football – Joe Buck, Steve Levy
 WNBA on ESPN – Ryan Ruocco, Pam Ward
 ESPN College Football on ABC and Saturday Night Football – Chris Fowler, Rece Davis, Sean McDonough, Joe Tessitore, Bob Wischusen, Dave Pasch, Mark Jones, Dave Flemming, Roy Philpott, Anish Shroff, Tiffany Greene, Tom Hart, Matt Barrie
 ESPN Major League Baseball on ABC – Karl Ravech, Jon Sciambi, Michael Kay
 NHL on ABC – Sean McDonough, Steve Levy, John Buccigross, Bob Wischusen
 Little League World Series – Karl Ravech, Mike Monaco
 Formula One — see Sky Sports F1
 Bundesliga on ABC – Derek Rae, Mark Donaldson
 La Liga on ABC – Ian Darke, Derek Rae, Rob Palmer
 International Soccer on ABC – Ian Darke, Jon Champion, Derek Rae, Steve Cangialosi, Mark Donaldson
 ESPN College Basketball on ABC – see List of ESPN College Basketball personalities
 NCAA Gymnastics Championship on ABC – Bart Conner
 XFL on ABC – Tom Hart, Matt Barrie, John Schriffen, Lowell Galindo

Color commentators
 NBA on ABC – Jeff Van Gundy, Mark Jackson, Hubie Brown, Doris Burke, Richard Jefferson, J.J. Redick, Steve Javie
 Monday Night Football – Troy Aikman, Louis Riddick, Dan Orlovsky, John Parry
 WNBA on ESPN – Rebecca Lobo, LaChina Robinson
 NHL on ABC – Ray Ferraro, Brian Boucher, A. J. Mleczko, Dave Jackson
 ESPN College Football on ABC and Saturday Night Football – Kirk Herbstreit, Todd Blackledge, Dan Orlovsky, Dusty Dvoracek, Greg McElroy, Robert Griffin III, Roddy Jones, Andre Ware, Brock Osweiler, Rod Gilmore, Jay Walker, Louis Riddick, Todd McShay, Matt Austin, Bill LeMonnier, John Parry
 ESPN Major League Baseball on ABC – Alex Rodriguez, Eduardo Pérez, David Cone
 Formula One — see Sky Sports F1
 Bundesliga on ABC – Taylor Twellman, Kasey Keller, Janusz Michallik, Lutz Pfannenstiel
 La Liga on ABC – Steve McManaman, Stewart Robson, Kasey Keller
 International Soccer on ABC – Steve McManaman, Taylor Twellman, Stewart Robson, Efan Ekoku, Alejandro Moreno, Kasey Keller
 ESPN College Basketball on ABC – see List of ESPN College Basketball personalities
 NCAA Gymnastics Championship on ABC – Kathy Johnson Clarke
 XFL on ABC – Greg McElroy, Cole Cubelic, Joey Galloway, Eric Mac Lain, Tom Luginbill, Harry Douglas, Sam Acho, Ian Fitzsimmons

Reporters
 NBA on ABC – Lisa Salters, Israel Gutierrez, Jorge Sedano, Cassidy Hubbarth, Malika Andrews, Monica McNutt
 Monday Night Football – Lisa Salters, Laura Rutledge
 WNBA on ESPN – Holly Rowe, Ros Gold-Onwude
 ESPN College Football on ABC and Saturday Night Football – Holly Rowe, Molly McGrath, Kris Budden, Quint Kessenich, Tom Luginbill, Katie George, Paul Carcaterra, Taylor McGregor, Tiffany Blackmon, Harry Lyles Jr.
 NFL Draft – Suzy Kolber
 NBA Draft – Monica McNutt
 ESPN Major League Baseball on ABC – Buster Olney, Alden Gonzalez
 NHL on ABC – Emily Kaplan, Leah Hextall, Laura Rutledge, Kevin Weekes
 Formula One — see Sky Sports F1
 Bundesliga on ABC – Archie Rhind-Tutt
 La Liga on ABC – Alexis Nunes, Martin Ainstein
 ESPN College Basketball on ABC – see List of ESPN College Basketball personalities
 XFL on ABC – Katie George, Tiffany Blackmon, Stormy Buonantony, Taylor McGregor

Studio hosts
 ESPN College Football on ABC and Saturday Night Football – Kevin Negandhi
 NBA Countdown – Mike Greenberg, Malika Andrews
 NHL on ABC – Steve Levy, John Buccigross, Arda Ocal
 NFL Draft – Rece Davis
 NBA Draft – Kevin Negandhi
 Monday Night Football – Suzy Kolber, Sam Ponder
 Bundesliga on ABC – Kay Murray
 La Liga on ABC – Dan Thomas, Kay Murray
 International Soccer on ABC – Rece Davis, Kelly Cates, Kay Murray

Studio analysts
 ESPN College Football on ABC and Saturday Night Football – Booger McFarland, Dan Mullen, Jesse Palmer
 NBA Countdown – Jalen Rose, Stephen A. Smith, Michael Wilbon, Kendrick Perkins, Magic Johnson, Adrian Wojnarowski
 Monday Night Football – Steve Young, Randy Moss, Adam Schefter, Booger McFarland, Tedy Bruschi, Rex Ryan, Matt Hasselbeck, Robert Griffin III
 NFL Draft – Kirk Herbstreit, Desmond Howard, David Pollack, Jesse Palmer, Todd McShay, Mel Kiper Jr., Louis Riddick
 NBA Draft – Jalen Rose, Chiney Ogwumike, Stephen A. Smith
 NHL on ABC – Barry Melrose, Mark Messier, Chris Chelios, Brian Boucher, P.K. Subban
 Bundesliga on ABC – Jürgen Klinsmann, Jan Åge Fjørtoft, Craig Burley, Kasey Keller, Steve Cherundolo
 La Liga on ABC – Luis Garcia, Pablo Zabaleta, Alejandro Moreno, Kasey Keller
 International Soccer on ABC – Steve McManaman, Alessandro Del Piero, Chris Coleman, Michael Ballack, Craig Burley, Efan Ekoku, Julie Foudy, Kasey Keller, Alejandro Moreno, Taylor Twellman, Mark Clattenburg

Former

Play-by-play
 ESPN College Football on ABC – Chris Schenkel, Gary Bender, Keith Jackson, Jim Lampley, Curt Gowdy, Brad Nessler, Brent Musburger, Bill Flemming, Tim Brant, Bud Campbell, Eric Collins, Dave Diles, Dan Dierdorf, Terry Gannon, Gary Gerould, Frank Gifford, Sean Grande, Charlie Jones, Chris Lincoln, Verne Lundquist, Dave Martin, Al Michaels, Gary Thorne, Roger Twibell, Corey McPherrin, Mike Tirico, Dr. Jerry Punch, Steve Zabriskie, Chip Tarkenton, Paul Page, Lynn Sanner, Adam Amin, Steve Levy
 College Basketball on ABC – Keith Jackson, Brad Nessler, Al Trautwig, Al Michaels, Gary Bender, Roger Twibell, Brent Musburger,  Fred White, Barry Tompkins, Dave Barnett, Jim Brinson, Tim Brant, Steve Physioc, Robin Roberts, Mike Goldberg, Bill Doleman, Jim Szoke, Ron Franklin, Dave Strader, Bob Carpenter, Terry Gannon, Gary Thorne
 Monday Night Football (ABC Era) – Keith Jackson, Al Michaels, Frank Gifford, Mike Patrick, Brent Musburger
 Monday Night Football (ESPN simulcasts; Wild Card/Pro Bowl) – Mike Tirico, Sean McDonough, Joe Tessitore
 Major League Baseball on ABC – Gary Bender, Jack Buck, Keith Jackson, Don Drysdale, Jim Lampley, Al Michaels, Bob Prince, Warner Wolf, Tim McCarver, Gary Thorne, Matt Vasgersian
 Olympics on ABC – Howard Cosell, Curt Gowdy, Chris Schenkel, Frank Gifford, Keith Jackson, Al Michaels, Bill Flemming, Tim Brant, Jack Whitaker, Sam Posey, Don Chevrier, Tim McCarver, Lynn Swann, Gary Bender, Donna de Varona, Arthur Ashe, Jim McKay, Dick Button, Stan Benham, Art Devlin, Jackie Stewart, Warner Wolf, Al Trautwig, Mike Adamle, Jiggs McDonald, Jim Lampley, Bob Beattie, Diana Nyad, Mario Machado, Mike Eruzione 
 Pro Bowlers Tour – Chris Schenkel
 MLS on ESPN – Phil Schoen, JP Dellacamera, Rob Stone, Jack Edwards, Dave O'Brien, Adrian Healey, Jon Champion, Steve Cangialosi
 NBA on ABC – Jim Durham, Al Michaels, Brent Musburger, Brad Nessler, John Saunders, Bill Flemming, Chet Forte, Jim Gordon, Curt Gowdy, Jerry Gross, Keith Jackson, Jim McKay, Chris Schenkel
 NHL on ABC – Gary Thorne, Mike Emrick, Al Michaels, Dave Strader, Tom Mees, Bob Miller, Sam Rosen
 Wide World of Sports – see Wide World of Sports (American TV series)#Event announcers
 NASCAR on ABC / IndyCar Series on ABC – Bob Jenkins, Jerry Punch, Marty Reid, Allen Bestwick
 XFL on ABC – Steve LevySerie A on ABC – Mark Donaldson, Steve Cangialosi, Ross Dyer

Color commentators
 ESPN College Football on ABC – Gary Danielson, Bob Griese, Chris Spielman, Ray Bentley, Dean Blevins, Terry Bowden, Tim Brant, Terry Brennan, Frank Broyles, Fran Curci, Duffy Daugherty, Steve Davis, Dan Dierdorf, John Dockery, Forest Evashevski, Rick Forzano, Dan Fouts, Russ Francis, Mike Golic, Lee Grosscup, Terry Hanratty, Brian Holloway, Jackie Jensen, Mike McGee, Ben Martin, Mike Mayock, David M. Nelson, David Norrie, Ara Parseghian, Dan Reeves, Reggie Rivers, Pepper Rodgers, Darrell Royal, Bo Schembechler, John Spagnola, Monty Stickles, Lynn Swann, Dick Vermeil, Paul Warfield, Bud Wilkinson, Jamal Anderson, Brian Griese
 ESPN College Basketball on ABC – Jim Valvano
 Monday Night Football (ABC era) – Don Meredith, John Madden, Frank Gifford, Dan Dierdorf, Boomer Esiason, O. J. Simpson, Howard Cosell, Fred Williamson, Alex Karras, Fran Tarkenton, Joe Namath, Dennis Miller, Dan Fouts
 (ESPN simulcasts; Wild Card/Pro Bowl) – Jon Gruden, Jason Witten, Booger McFarland, Brian Griese
 Major League Baseball on ABC – Reggie Jackson, Tim McCarver, Jim Palmer, Howard Cosell, Chipper Jones
 PGA Tour on ABC – Nick Faldo, Paul Azinger, Ian Baker-Finch, Peter Alliss, Curtis Strange, Jack Nicklaus
 Olympics on ABC – Donna de Varona, O. J. Simpson, Mark Spitz, Digger Phelps
 Pro Bowlers Tour – Billy Welu, Nelson Burton, Jr.
 MLS on ESPN – Alexi Lalas, Kyle Martino, John Harkes, Eric Wynalda, Ty Keough, Julie Foudy, Taylor Twellman, Alejandro Moreno, Brian Dunseth, Herculez Gomez, Kasey Keller
 NASCAR on ABC – Dale Jarrett, Andy Petree, Larry Nuber, Benny Parsons, Ned Jarrett 
 NHL on ABC – Bill Clement, John Davidson, Joe Micheletti, Darren Pang, Barry Melrose, Jim Schoenfeld, Brian Engblom, Brian Hayward
 Triple Crown – Charlsie Cantey
 NBA on ABC – Sean Elliott, Steve Jones, Dan Majerle, Jack Ramsay, Doc Rivers, Tom Tolbert
 Rugby World Cup – Grant Fox
 Indianapolis 500 – Jackie Stewart, Sam Posey
 IndyCar Series on ABC – Eddie Cheever, Scott GoodyearSerie A on ABC – Matteo Bonatti, Janusz MichallikInternational Soccer on ABC – Tommy Smyth, Paul Mariner (deceased)

Reporters
 Monday Night Football –  Lynn Swann, Lesley Visser, Melissa Stark, Michele Tafoya, Sam Ryan, Eric Dickerson, Lisa Guerrero
 Major League Baseball on ABC – Jim Gray
 ESPN College Football on ABC – Lynn Swann, Jenn Brown, Lisa Salters, Erin Andrews, Jack Arute, Todd Harris, Shannon Spake, Heather Cox, Sam Ponder, Tom Rinaldi, Maria Taylor, Allison Williams
 College Basketball on ABC – Thea Andrews
 PGA Tour on ABC – Bob Rosburg, Billy Ray Brown, Judy Rankin
 NASCAR on ABC/IndyCar Series on ABC – Chris Economaki, Bill Weber, Jerry Punch, Vince Welch, Dave Burns, Rick DeBruhl, Jamie Little
 NHL on ABC – Al Morganti, Bob Neumeier, Brenda Brenon, Mark Jones, Sam Ryan, Brian Engblom, Darren Pang, Steve Levy, Erin Andrews, Joe Micheletti, Daryl Reaugh, Mickey Redmond, Christine Simpson, Tony Granato
 NBA on ABC – David Aldridge, Heather Cox, Mark Jones, Sal Masekela, Michele Tafoya, Stuart Scott, Tom Rinaldi
 Saturday Night Football – Lisa Salters, Erin Andrews, Heather Cox, Sam Ponder, Tom Rinaldi, Maria Taylor
 MLS on ESPN – Brandi Chastain, Heather Mitts, Lorrie Fair, Allen Hopkins, Roger Twibell, Julie Stewart-Binks, Sebastian Salazar, Cristina Alexander, Jillian Sakovits
 XFL on ABC – Dianna Russini, Pat McAfee, Molly McGrath

Studio hosts
 Monday Night Football – Chris Berman, Brent Musburger, Frank Gifford
 Olympics on ABC – Jim McKay, Chris Schenkel, Jim Lampley, Keith Jackson, Frank Gifford, Kathie Lee Gifford, Kathleen Sullivan, Donna de Varona
 Wide World of Sports (American TV series) – Jim McKay, Frank Gifford, Julie Moran, Robin Roberts, John Saunders, Becky Dixon 
 NHL on ABC – Al Michaels, John Saunders, Chris Berman
 IndyCar Series on ABC – Jim McKay, Chris Schenkel, Al Michaels, Bob Jenkins, Paul Page, Brent Musburger, Lindsay Czarniak, Nicole Briscoe, Charlie Brockman, Dave Diles, Terry Gannon, Jackie Stewart, Keith Jackson
 NASCAR on ESPN – Brent Musburger, Nicole Briscoe
 NBA on ABC – Dan Patrick, John Saunders, Stuart Scott, Sage Steele, Hannah Storm, Michelle Beadle, Rachel Nichols, Maria Taylor
 NFL Draft – Robin Roberts
 ESPN College Football on ABC – Bud Palmer, Merle Harmon, Dave Diles, Warner Wolf, Andrea Kirby, Chris Schenkel, Jim Lampley, Jack Whitaker, Al Trautwig, Jim Hill, Roger Twibell, John Saunders
 MLS on ESPN – Adrian Healey, Sebastian Salazar

Studio analysts
 NBA on ABC – Avery Johnson, Doug Collins, Steve Jones, George Karl, Paul Pierce, Scottie Pippen, Byron Scott, Bill Simmons, Tom Tolbert, Bill Walton, Chauncey Billups, Jay Williams
 NFL Draft – Lee Corso, Daniel Jeremiah, Michael Irvin, Kurt Warner, Booger McFarland
 NHL on ABC – Barry Melrose, John DavidsonMLS on ESPN'' – Alejandro Moreno, Brian Dunseth, Herculez Gomez, Kasey Keller

Behind-the-scenes personnel
 Chuck Howard
 Edgar J. Scherick
 Robert Riger
 Eleanor Sanger

Presidents

ABC Sports
 Roone Arledge (1968–1986)
 Dennis Swanson (1986–1996)
 Steve Bornstein (1996–1999)
 Howard Katz (1999–2003)
 George Bodenheimer (2003–2006)

ESPN
 Steve Bornstein (1996–1999)
 George Bodenheimer (1999–2012)
 John Skipper (2012–2017)
 James Pitaro (2018–present)

Main competitors
 CBS Sports
CBS Sports Network
 Fox Sports
 Fox Sports 1
 Fox Sports 2
 NBC Sports
 USA
 Peacock
 CNBC
 Warner Bros. Discovery Sports
 AT&T SportsNet
 TUDN (Univision)
TUDN (TV network)
 Telemundo
Telemundo Deportes

References

Bibliography

External links
 
 Saunders: ABC's demise signals end of an era
 What to Watch: Rest in peace, ABC Sports
 The Evolution of ABC

ABC
2006 American television series debuts